Aarani is a municipality city in district of Tiruvannamalai, Tamil Nadu, India. The Aarani city is divided into 33 wards for which elections are held every 5 years. The Aarani Municipality has population of 92375 of which 45,187 are males while 47188 are females as per report released by Census India 2011.

Population of Children with age of 0-6 is 6346 which is 9.97% of total population of Aarani (M). In Arani Municipality, Female Sex Ratio is of 1036 against state average of 996. Moreover, Child Sex Ratio in Arani is around 983 compared to Tamil Nadu state average of 943. Literacy rate of Arani city is 85.41% higher than state average of 80.09%. In Arani, Male literacy is around 91.62% while female literacy rate is 79.45%.

Aarani Municipality has total administration over 24,889 houses to which it supplies basic amenities like water and sewerage. It is also authorize to build roads within Municipality limits and impose taxes on properties coming under its jurisdiction.

References

Cities and towns in Tiruvannamalai district